The Battle of Populonia was fought in 282 BC between the Roman Republic and the Etruscans.  The Etruscans and Gauls were in revolt against Rome.  The Romans were victorious, and the Etruscan threat to Rome sharply diminished after this battle.

References

282 BC
280s BC conflicts
Populonia 282 BC
Populonia
3rd century BC in the Roman Republic